Goodwood Road may refer to a number of roads:

 Goodwood Road, Adelaide, a road to the south of Adelaide, South Australia
 Goodwood Road, Hobart, link road to the Bowen Bridge in Hobart, Tasmania